Edmond Armen Nazaryan (born 19 January 2002) is a Bulgarian Greco-Roman wrestler of Armenian descent. He won the silver medal in the 60 kg event at the 2022 World Wrestling Championships held in Belgrade, Serbia. He won the gold medal in the 55 kg event at the 2020 European Wrestling Championships held in Rome, Italy.

Career 

In 2018, he won the bronze medal in the boys' Greco-Roman 45 kg event at the Summer Youth Olympics held in Buenos Aires, Argentina. In the bronze medal match he defeated Arslanbek Zakirbayev of Turkmenistan.

He won the silver medal in the 60 kg event at the 2022 European Wrestling Championships held in Budapest, Hungary. He won the silver medal in the 60 kg event at the 2022 World Wrestling Championships held in Belgrade, Serbia.

Achievements

Personal life 

Armen Nazaryan is his father, a two-time Olympic Champion in Greco-Roman wrestling.

References

External links 

 

Living people
2002 births
Bulgarian male sport wrestlers
Wrestlers at the 2018 Summer Youth Olympics
Bulgarian people of Armenian descent
European Wrestling Championships medalists
Sportspeople from Sofia
European Wrestling Champions
21st-century Bulgarian people
World Wrestling Championships medalists